James Kaler may refer to:

 James Otis Kaler (1848–1912), American journalist and author of children's literature
 James B. Kaler (born 1938), American astronomer and science writer